Curmudgeon may refer to:

 Dyskolos, sometimes translated The Curmudgeon, an ancient Greek comic play by Menander
 Curmudgeons (film), a 2016 short film

See also
 I, Curmudgeon, a 2004 documentary film by Alan Zweig
 The Comics Curmudgeon, blog analyzing newspaper comics
 I quatro rusteghi, sometimes translated  The Four Curmudgeons, a comic opera
 Il burbero di buon cuore, sometimes translated The Good-Hearted Curmudgeon, an opera dramma giocoso
 Misanthropy